Soehrensia schickendantzii is a cactus found in northwestern Argentina in provinces of Salta and Tucumán at elevations of 1600 to 3200 meters.

Description
Soehrensia schickendantzii grows shrubby, occasionally solitary, but usually branches out from the base and forms clumps. The cylindrical to elongated, shiny light green shoots are 15 to 25 centimeters long and have diameters of up to 6 centimeters. There are 14 to 18 low and somewhat sharp ribs that are notched. The areoles on it are very close together and occasionally even touch. The yellowish thorns originating from the areoles are flexible and up to 1 centimeter long. Four central spines are formed. Occasionally the number increases with age. There are nine marginal spines.

The hypanthium is tubular to funnel-shaped, white, unscented flowers appear near the top of the shoot and open at night. They are 20 to 22 inches long. The flower tube is densely hairy black. The spherical, dark green fruits are sweet and tear open. They have a length of up to 6 centimeters and a diameter of 5 centimeters.

Taxonomy
The plant was first circumscribed by Frédéric Albert Constantin Weber and published in 1896 as Echinopsis schickendantzii then Schlumpb. re-named it as Soehrensia schickendantzii in Cactaceae Syst. Init. vol.28: 31 in 2012.

The Latin epithet of schickendantzii honors the German chemist Friedrich Schickendantz (1837–1896), who emigrated to Argentina in 1861.

References

External links
 
 

Cacti of South America
Flora of Northwest Argentina
schickendantzii